Darawat Dam is concrete gravity dam across Nai Baran River near Village of Jhangri in Jamshoro district of Sindh, Pakistan.

Construction of dam started in March 2010 and its completion was inaugurated by Former President of Pakistan Asif Ali Zardari on 9 March 2013. Its estimated cost was PKR 9.3 Billion.

The dam is 250 metres (820 ft) in length and 43 metres (141 ft) in height, which would store about 150 million cubic metres (120,000 acre ft) of water to help irrigate  of land.

See also
 List of dams and reservoirs in Pakistan
 List of power stations in Pakistan
 Satpara Dam
 Allai Khwar Hydropower Project
 Gomal Zam Dam

References

Dams in Pakistan
Gravity dams
Dams completed in 2013
2013 establishments in Pakistan